Optics Letters is a biweekly peer-reviewed scientific journal published by Optica (formerly known as Optical Society of America). It was established in July 1977. The editor-in-chief is Miguel Alonso (University of Rochester). The journal covers all topics pertaining to optics and photonics. Publishing formats are short and rapid communications, with articles being limited to four journal pages.

Abstracting and indexing
The journal is abstracted and indexed in:

According to the Journal Citation Reports, the journal has a 2021 impact factor of 3.560.

References

External links

Optics journals
Optica (society) academic journals
Publications established in 1977
Biweekly journals
English-language journals